Stadtschlaining is a town in the district of Oberwart in the Austrian state of Burgenland. The Burg Schlaining, built by Henry I Kőszegi, is located there, which hosts the Austrian Study Centre for Peace and Conflict Resolution (ASPR) and the Peace Museum.

Population

References

Gallery 

Cities and towns in Oberwart District
Siebengemeinden